Events from the year 2021 in the Netherlands.

Incumbents
 Monarch: Willem-Alexander
 Prime Minister: Mark Rutte
 Speaker of the House of Representatives: Vera Bergkamp
 President of the Senate: Jan Anthonie Bruijn

Events

January to March
 14 January – Lodewijk Asscher resigns as Leader of the Labour Party following the childcare benefits scandal; Lilianne Ploumen succeeds him four days later.
 15 January – The Third Rutte cabinet becomes a demissionary cabinet following the childcare benefits scandal.
 23–26 January – Protests and riots take place across the country as a 9 pm curfew is put into effect in a context of COVID-19 pandemic.
 15–17 March – A general election for the House of Representatives took place.

April to June
 18–22 May – The Eurovision Song Contest 2021 was held in Rotterdam after the cancellation of the 2020 contest due to the COVID-19 pandemic. Italy took the victory. 
 9 June - In Noordwijk, the Museum of Comic Art, Noordwijk opens its doors to the general public.

July to September
 6 July - Killing of Peter R. de Vries
 14–15 July - Floods in Limburg
 5 September - Max Verstappen wins the Dutch Grand Prix.

October to December
 19-21 November - November 2021 riots in the Netherlands

References

 
Netherlands
Netherlands
2020s in the Netherlands
Years of the 21st century in the Netherlands